Boo Seung-kwan (born January 16, 1998), better known mononymously as Seungkwan, is a South Korean singer and entertainer under Pledis Entertainment. He is a member of the South Korean boy group Seventeen and is a member of the Vocal Team subunit. He is also part of the special unit BSS alongside Hoshi and DK. Apart from his group's activities, Seungkwan is known as an entertainment figure for his active participation in Korean variety show such as Unexpected Q, Prison Life of Fools, and Idol Dictation Contest.

Early life 
Boo was raised in Jeju-do, South Korea. Growing up he participated in children's songs festivals held at his school, where a teacher recorded him singing and posted it online. The video later led to Boo being cast at Pledis Entertainment in June 2012. Boo attended Seoul Broadcasting High School and graduated in 2016.

Career

2015–present: Debut with Seventeen and solo activities
Boo debuted as a member of the South Korean boy band, Seventeen with the extended play 17 Carat on May 29, 2015. In 2018, Boo released the single "Kind of Love" for the soundtrack of the series Mother. The song portrays a sorrowful love story with an acoustic sound. Boo joined alongside bandmates Hoshi and DK a subunit called BSS, or BooSeokSoon, a common nickname for the three members together. The group released their debut single "Just Do It" on March 21. That same year, Boo was cast in the talk show Unexpected Q. He was awarded the "Rookie (Music and Talk)" award at the 2018 MBC Entertainment Awards.

In 2019, Boo was cast in Prison Life of Fools and in the talk show Five Cranky Brothers. On September 7, 2020, Boo released the single "Go" for the soundtrack of the series Record of Youth. On January 29, 2021, Boo participated in the soundtrack for the series Lovestruck in the City  with a song titled "The Reason". Boo was cast in the television show Job Dongsan, alongside Kang Ho-dong and Super Junior's Eunhyuk, and in Idol Dictation Contest. Later, he appeared on tvN's new badminton television show Racket Boys, alongside Olympic champion Oh Sang-uk, Jang Sung-kyu, Yang Se-chan among others. In January 2022, Boo was awarded the "Male Idol Entertainer" award at the 2022 Korea First Brand Daesang.

Filmography

Television shows

Web shows

Discography

Soundtrack appearances

Awards and nominations

References

External links

Living people
Musicians from Busan
South Korean male idols
South Korean male pop singers
21st-century South Korean male singers
South Korean dance musicians
Pledis Entertainment artists
1998 births
Hybe Corporation artists
People from Jeju Province